Macrelcana ungeri is an extinct orthopteran insect from the Miocene epoch (~12 mya). It belongs to the same family as wetas and potato bugs (Stenopelmatidae).

References 

Stenopelmatoidea
Insects described in 1838
Prehistoric insect genera